Khudiram Bose Pusa station is a two platform station located in Samastipur district, Bihar, India with zero originating trains.

History
The station name was Waini railway station. Later it was named Pusa road Waini after establishing Dr Rajendra Prasad Agriculture University in Pusa.  After few years Waini removed and knowen as Pusa Road for a long. After 1990s this station named Khudiram Bose Pusa to honour the youngest Bengali revolutionary Khudiram Bose, who was caught here by two armed constables.

 He reached the station after covering  distance walking barefoot after bombing the carriage of Kingsford. The bomb hit its target successfully and the carriage blew up. However, the carriage was occupied not by Kingsford but instead by the wife and daughter of barrister Pringle Kennedy.

References

External links
KRBP/Khudiram B Pusa (2 PFs) Railway Station Map/Atlas - India Rail Info
Khudiram Bose Pusa Railway Station in Panoramio

Railway stations in Samastipur district
Sonpur railway division